Kusuman is a district (amphoe) of Sakon Nakhon province, Thailand.

Geography
Neighboring districts are (from the south clockwise) Phon Na Kaeo and Mueang Sakon Nakhon of Sakon Nakhon Province, Na Wa, Phon Sawan, Mueang Nakhon Phanom, and Pla Pak of Nakhon Phanom province.

History
The district dates back to Mueang Kusuman, which was established in 1844. In 1862 a second mueang named Phot Phaisan was established nearby. In 1914 Kusuman was reduced to a tambon of Mueang Sakon Nakhon district. In 1962 Kusuman was again named a minor district (king amphoe), as the large size of Mueang District made it difficult to administer. It was upgraded to a full district on 14 November 1967.

Administration 
The district is divided into five sub-districts (tambons), which are further subdivided into 63 villages (mubans). Kusuman is a township (thesaban tambon) which covers parts of tambon Kusuman. There are a further five tambon administrative organizations (TAO).

References

External links
amphoe.com

Kut Bak